Stenoglene livingstonensis is a moth in the family Eupterotidae. It was described by Strand in 1909. It is found in Zambia.

References

Moths described in 1909
Janinae